The Baden Revolution of 1848/1849 was a regional uprising in the Grand Duchy of Baden which was part of the revolutionary unrest that gripped almost all of Central Europe at that time.

As part of the popular liberal March Revolution in the states of the German Confederation the revolution in the state of Baden in what is now southwestern Germany was driven to a great extent by radical democratic influences: they were striving to create a Baden republic—subordinated to a greater Germany—under the sovereignty of the people, and aligned themselves against the ruling princes.

Their high points were the Hecker uprising in April 1848, the Struve Putsch of September 1848 and the rebellion as part of the Imperial Constitution campaign in May 1849 which assumed civil war-like proportions and was also known as the May Revolution. The rebellion ended on 23 July 1849 with the military defeat of the last revolt and the capture of Rastatt Fortress by federal troops under Prussian leadership.

Historical overview 

Among the participants at the festival was Johann Philipp Becker. After the outbreak of the French Revolution of 1848 in Paris and the proclamation of the Second Republic in France, the revolutionary spark initially jumped to Baden before the other countries of the German Confederation gave way to revolutionary unrest and uprisings.

The German March revolution not only started in Baden, but also ended here when Rastatt Fortress, the last bastion of the revolutionaries, was captured by Prussian troops on 23 July 1849.

The Baden Revolution had two phases: between the beginning of March 1848 and September 1848 there were two attempts to form a republic in southwestern Germany: the Hecker Uprising and the rebellion led by Gustav Struve in Lörrach. With the defeat of Friedrich Hecker and his followers at Kandern and his flight into exile, and the arrest of Gustav Struve in September, this first phase ended.

The second phase began—after the rejection of the Constitution of St. Paul's Church by the most of the royal houses of the German Parliament—with the May insurrections of 1849, not only in Baden, but also in other German states (especially in the Bavarian Rhenish Palatinate). They represented an attempt to enforce the constitution (the so-called Imperial Constitution Campaign). This second phase ended in Baden with the defeat of the rebels at the last battle in July 1849 in Rastatt.

Characteristic of the Baden Revolution, unlike other uprisings in the German Confederation, was the persistent demand for a democratic republic. By contrast, the revolutionary councils and parliaments of the other principalities of the Confederation favoured a constitutional and hereditary monarchy.

Radical democratic and early socialist revolutionaries were strongly represented in Baden. Some of the most prominent leaders were Friedrich Hecker, Gustav Struve and his wife Amalie, Gottfried Kinkel, Georg Herwegh and his wife Emma. Furthermore, Wilhelm Liebknecht, who at that time was relatively unknown but later co-founded the Social Democratic Workers' Party of Germany (SDAP), the predecessor party of SPD (the socialist party in Germany), participated in September 1848 in the uprising in Lörrach and in May 1849 in the Baden Revolution as Struve's adjutant.

The socialist Friedrich Engels who, during the March revolution wrote for the  published in Cologne by Karl Marx, also took an active part in 1849 in the final phase of the Baden Revolution in the fighting against counter-revolutionary Prussian troops. Finally, the married couple Fritz and Mathilde Franziska Anneke from Cologne joined the Baden rebels.

The following table shows the connexion between the revolution in Baden, the events in the German Confederation and Europe.

Chronology 

 12 September 1847: In the Offenburg Assembly of the key supporters of the constitution, Friedrich Hecker takes the 13 "demands of the people in Baden" for citizens' rights, social security and equality, which Gustav Struve consolidated into four "pressing demands of the deputations in Carlsruhe": 1. Arming of the people with open elections of officers. 2. Unrestricted press freedom. 3. Jury courts based on the English model. 4. Immediate formation of a German parliament.
 27 February 1848: The Mannheim People's Assembly take up the 13 demands of the people again and send them as a petition to the Second Chamber of the Baden .
The delegation arrives at the state capital on 1 March.
Several demonstrators enter the building. Hecker demands the removal of the privileges of the nobility and the liberation of the peasants, thus removing the last vestiges of medieval feudalism.
 2 March 1848: The First Chamber adopts a bill to abolish the remnants of feudalism, to make the army swear loyalty to the Baden Constitution and to establish religious equality for members of non-Christian faiths.
 4 March 1848: Peasants' revolt in North Baden. The revolution spreads to other states in the German Confederation.
 19 March 1848: Great People's Assembly in Offenburg which is attended by 20,000 people. Hecker and Struve speak to the crowd. They accuse the government of Baden of having indeed agreed to the 13 demands of the people of the past year in September in the wake of the popular movement in early March, but in delaying their implementation only wanting to win time to withdrawal of concessions again at the earliest opportunity.
 26 March 1848: Karl von Rotteck junior opens a public meeting in Freiburg in the presence of Struve, where the organizers call for the safeguarding of personal liberty by a special law ("Habeas Corpus Act") and the complete separation of church and state. In the intoxication of enthusiasm, the assembly on the  approved a letter to the Prussian king, in which Struve criticises Frederick William's behaviour in the March days as a "royal actor and citizen killer".
 12 April 1848: In Konstanz Hecker and Struve proclaim the republic and call on the people to take up arms in the name of a provisional government. The Hecker Uprising makes its way to the Rhine Plain where it intends to unite with a procession led by Georg Herwegh, the "German Democratic Legion" from France, in order to march on the state capital of Karlsruhe.
 20 April 1848: Battle on the Scheideck. At Kandern in the Black Forest the rebels of the Hecker contingent are defeated and routed by Hessian troops. Friedrich Hecker flees into exile, initially in Switzerland and finally to the USA.
 24 April 1848: Volunteers under Franz Sigel march to Freiburg, which is occupied by rebels, in order to break through the ring of government troops. The relief operation fails. Instead, government forces storm the last barricade at the Swabian Gate and bring about a bloodbath among the volunteers.
 27. April 1848: Herwegh's 900-strong "German Legion" is defeated at the Battle of Dossenbach by Württemberg infantry.
 21 September 1848: At an uprising in Lörrach, under the cry of "Health, Education, Freedom for All!", Struve again proclaims a republic, but only gets as far as Staufen in his subsequent journey northwards. At the Battle for Staufen Bade troops defeat the rebels. Struve is apprehended a few days later (see Struve Putsch).
 29 January 1849: In Freiburg Karl von Rotteck junior founds the Republican People's Union. As a counter-movement, on 18 February, his cousin, Mayor Joseph von Rotteck, and other constitutional liberals announce the founding assembly of a Fatherland Union, loyal to the sovereign. Both unions fight one another in a stubborn propaganda war.
 20 March 1849: In Freiburg, the trial begins of Gustav Struve and Karl Blind in the Basler Hof before a jury court. Following their sentencing to eight years' imprisonment the criminals are taken to Rastatt Fortress.
 9 May 1849: During the course of the May uprisings of 1849, by which people attempt to enforce the recognition of the changes to the imperial constitution brought about by the revolution in the individual states of the German Confederation, soldiers of the Baden Army garrison in the federal fortress at Rastatt mutiny and fraternize with some of the revolutionary vigilantes in a "show of loyalty and love for the people".
 11 May 1849: Fraternization of Republicans with the 2nd Baden Infantry Regiment in Freiburg
 12/13 May 1849: At the delegate's conference of the Baden People's Unions in Freiburg Amand Goegg asks "the question about the proclamation of the republic" but finds no support.

 13 May 1849: A people's assembly in Offenburg agrees a 16-point programme, which inter alia demands the unconditional recognition of the imperial constitution and the formation of a new—albeit still grand ducal—government under the liberal politician, Lorenz Brentano. The official grand ducal government refuses the demands of the Offenburg Assembly. On the evening of 13 May the revolutionary state committee of people's unions drives to Rastatt, where Amand Goegg announces the Offenburg agreement from the balcony of the town hall and Brentano swears in militia and soldiers to the imperial constitution. That same night of 13/14 May Grand Duke Leopold flees from his  in Karlsruhe into exile at Koblenz.
 14 May 1849: The Hoffmann / Bekk Ministry is declared dismissed and an Executive Commission of the State Committee, which initially takes over the government business in the absence of the grand ducal government which has fled, establishes itself with Amand Goegg, Joseph Ignatz Peter and Carl Joseph Eichfeldt under their president, Lorenz Brentano.
 May 1849: Johann Philipp Becker is tasked with the creation and organisation of the  militia. His first order of the day is dated 21 May.
 1 June 1849: Under Lorenz Brentano a provisional democratic government is formed, in which the conservative-liberal forces dominate; the state committee disbands itself.
 3 June 1849: The men of Baden eligible to vote agree to the Electoral Code of the German National Assembly on the composition of a constituent national assembly. However, the Baden Constituent Assembly of 1849 only lasted from 10 June to 30 June 1849.
 5 June 1849: In Karlsruhe, a "Club of Resolute Progress" (') forms under the leadership of Struve, now released, and Becker and demands from the government decisive revolutionary measures. The delegation had them arrested by the delegation, but they had to be released under pressure from the volunteers stationed in the town.
 June 1849: The Polish revolutionary, Ludwik Mierosławski, is appointed as General of the Revolution Army. Federal troops under the command of Lieutenant General Eduard von Peucker and two improvised Prussian army corps under the Prince of Prussia as well as a Hessian contingent of troops under Friedrich Ferdinand Wilhelm von Schäffer-Bernstein invade Baden, in order to defeat the revolution.
 15/16 June 1849: Baden forces win battles on the line of the River Neckar at Mannheim, Käferthal, Ladenburg and Hirschhorn
 20 June 1849: After ousting the revolutionary troops, the First Prussian Corps under Moritz von Hirschfeld leaves the Palatinate over the Rhine near Germersheim
 21/22 June 1849: Hirschfeld gains victory in the Battle of Waghäusel forcing the Baden troops to retreat in order to escape being surrounded.
 25 June 1849: Battle of Durlach, at which Becker's  cover the withdrawal of the army at the line of the Murg. The revolutionary government flees to Freiburg im Breisgau and with it, the revolutionary troops.
 28 June 1849: The constitutional assembly meets in the Basler Hof at Freiburg. At the direction of Struves they agree to continue the war against "the enemies of German unity and freedom" with all means at their disposal. Whereupon Brentano stands down as head of the government and Amand Goegg together with Minister of War, Werner, form the "provisional government of Baden with dictatorial powers“.

 29/30 June 1849: Bloody fighting on the Murg at the Battle of Gernsbach on 29 June. Ludwik Mierosławski appoints Major Gustav Tiedemann from Struve's circle as Governor of Rastatt Fortress. Revolutionary units withdraw to South Baden. The Second Prussian Corps under Karl von der Groeben destroys Rastatt.
 1 July 1849: A final contingent of about 4,000 men marches past to the representatives of the revolutionary government and their supreme commander, Franz Sigel in Freiburg.
 7 July 1849: The Prussians march into Freiburg unopposed.
 9 July 1849 The citizen's militia of Sipplingen arrest insurgents in Bodman and transfer them to Pfullendorf.
 12 July 1849 Revolutionary troops cross the border into Switzerland at Baltersweil and Konstanz and ask for asylum.
 23 July 1849: After being surrounded for three weeks Rastaat surrenders to Groeben. The Governor of Rastatt becomes the Prussian general, Heinrich von Holleben.

The revolution had failed. The Baden Army was disbanded and later rebuilt under Prussian leadership. Many of the rebels escaped into exile including Struve, Brentano, Carl Schurz, Friedrich Engels and Friedrich Beust; others were arrested and brought before courts martial with Prussian and Baden boards. Following the fall of Rastatt, the Prussian commander, Karl Alois Fickler, the brother of Baden agitator, Joseph Fickler, was charged with the defence of the accused. The courts sentenced 27 rebels to death by firing squad (including the last fortress commandant of Rastatt, Gustav Tiedemann) and pronounced long gaol sentences in Prussian prisons against other revolutionaries. In the casemates of Rastatt, where many revolutionaries were held prisoner, typhoid fever broke out and caused many deaths.

Revolutionaries executed by court martial 
From 27 July to 27 October 1849, courts martial took place in Mannheim, Rastatt and Freiburg. A total of 27 death sentences were pronounced and carried out – four other death sentences were not carried out.

In Rastatt 

In Rastatt, 19 death sentences were pronounced. Otto von Corvin, who had also been given the death sentence, was reprieved and his sentence commuted to imprisonment.

 Gottfried Bauer (d. 4 October 1849) – private soldier, Gissigheim
 Karl Bernigau (d. 20 October 1849) – major, Mühlhausen
 Ernst Gustav von Biedenfeld (d. 9 August 1849) – battalion commander, Bühl
 Georg Böhning (d. 17 August 1849) – clockmaker, commander of the refugee legion, finished as colonel, Wiesbaden
 Andreas Counis (d. 15 September 1849) – private soldier, Pforzheim
 Ernst Elsenhans (d. 7 August 1849) – publisher, Feuerbach
 Josef Günthard (d. 22 September 1849) – private soldier, Konstanz
 Konrad Heilig (d. 11 August 1849) – former Baden NCO, finished as major and commander of the fortress artillery at Rastatt, Pfullendorf
 Karl Jakobi (d. 3 September 1849) – major of the labour battalion, Mannheim
 Peter Jäger (d. 22 September 1849) – private soldier, Assamstadt
 Jean Josef Jansen (d. 20 October 1849) – surveyor, Cologne
 Josef Kilmarx (d. 8 October 1849) – sergeant, Rastatt
 Ludwig Kohlenbecker (d. 8 October 1849) – private soldier, Karlsruhe
 Konrad Lenzinger (d. 25 August 1849) – corporal, Durlach
 Theophil Mniewski (d. 25 August 1849) – Polish officer, Wodzierady (Russian Poland)
 Ludwig Peter Wilhelm Schade (d. 12 September 1849) – lieutenant, Karlsruhe
 Friedrich Wilhelm Schrader (d. 20 October 1849) – deserter from the 8th Prussian Artillery Brigade, Mansfeld
 Gustav Nikolaus Tiedemann (d. 11 August 1849) – former Baden dragoon lieutenant, finished as colonel and commander of Rastatt Fortress, Landshut
 Philipp Zenthöfer (d. 25 August 1849) – gunsmith and private soldier, Mannheim

In Freiburg 
Following court martial-like proceedings three revolutionaries were sentenced to death in 1849 in Freiburg and executed by firing squad at Wiehre Cemetery on the dates shown:

 Johann Maximilian Dortu: Prussian NCO, during the revolution major in the Baden  – sentenced on 11 July by the military court; d. 31 July
 Friedrich Neff: student of philosophy, participant in the uprisings led by Hecker and Struve; d. 9 August 
 Gebhard Kromer: corporal in the Baden revolutionary army; d. 21 August

In Mannheim 
In Mannheim five death sentences were pronounced. Theodor Mögling, who was also sentenced to death in Mannheim, was reprieved and his sentence commuted to a term of imprisonment. The Mannheim court martial issued gaol sentences of 10 years in 15 other cases.

 Karl Höfer (d. 16 August 1849): teacher, Brehmen/Altneudorf
 Valentin Streuber (d. 11 October 1849)
 Adolf von Trützschler (d. 14 August 1849)
 Peter Lacher (d. 28. August 1849)
 Gottlieb Heinrich Dietz (d. 20 August 1849)

In popular culture

Theatre 
 The  On 4 July 1998 Stuttgart acknowledged the Baden revolutionaries in a performance in period uniforms and with historical props for the 125th anniversary of the address by Friedrich Hecker on 4 July 1873.

Film 
 . Four-part TV film. Revolutionary drama about the Baden Revolution of 1849. After the eponymous translation of the original English historic novel by Stefan Heym. Bundesrepublik Deutschland, 1986, 4 × 90 min., directed by: Dieter Berner.

See also 
 Enno Sander 
 Otto von Corvin

References

Further reading 
 Badisches Landesmuseum Karlsruhe (publ.): 1848/49. Revolution der deutschen Demokraten in Baden. Nomos Verlagsgesellschaft, Baden-Baden, 1998, .
 Alfred Georg Frei, Kurt Hochstuhl: Wegbereiter der Demokratie. Die badische Revolution 1848/49. Der Traum von der Freiheit. Verlag G. Braun, Karlsruhe, 1997, .
 Stefan Heym: Lenz oder die Freiheit. (novel, old title: Die Papiere des Andreas Lenz), btb Verlag, new edition, September 2005, .Belletristik
 Wolfgang von Hippel: Revolution im Südwesten. Das Großherzogtum Baden 1848/49. Kohlhammer, Stuttgart, 1998  (=Schriften zur politischen Landeskunde Baden-Württembergs Vol. 26)
 Der Rhein-Neckar-Raum und die Revolution von 1848/49. Revolutionäre und ihre Gegenspieler. Publ. by the working party of the Archives in the Rhine-Neckar Triangle. With annexes by Hans Fenske and Erich Schneider. Verlag Regionalkultur Ubstadt-Weiher, 1998. 
 Otto Wermuth: „Wir haben´s gewagt“, Die badisch-pfälzische Revolution 1849. Rombach Verlag, 1981, .
 Klaus Gaßner/Diana Finkele: Der Aufstand der badischen Demokraten. Verlag Regionalkultur, 
 Susanne Asche und Ernst Otto Bräunche (eds.): Die Straße der Demokratie. Info Verlag, Karlsruhe, 2007
 Ang. Hauser-Hauswirth: Wege der Revolutionäre. Wanderrouten Deutsche Revolution in Baden 1848/49, LpB, Baden-Württemberg, 1998
 Frank Engehausen: Kleine Geschichte der Revolution 1848/49 in Baden. G. Braun Buchverlag, Karlsruhe, 2010,

External links 

 
 Kapitel Karlsruhe aus Die deutsche Reichsverfassungskampagne von Friedrich Engels, veröffentlicht 1850 (online-Auszug aus Karl Marx, Friedrich Engels: Werke, Band 7, „Die deutsche Reichsverfassungskampagne“, S. 133–145, Dietz Verlag, Berlin/DDR 1960)
 Kapitel Für Republik zu sterben aus Die deutsche Reichsverfassungskampagne von Friedrich Engels, veröffentlicht 1850
 Virtueller Rundgang durch eine Museumsausstellung zur Badischen Revolution (auf „Rundgang“ klicken)
 Freiburgs Geschichte in Zitaten und die Revolution in Baden
 Die badische Revolution und der Revolutionsführer Maximilian Werner
 Eintrag im Stadtwiki Karlsruhe

 
.
.
Grand Duchy of Baden
German revolutions of 1848–1849
Military history of the Grand Duchy of Baden
Events that led to courts-martial